Alexander Stewart (September 12, 1829May 24, 1912) was a member of the United States House of Representatives for Wisconsin.

Born in Fredericton in the colony of New Brunswick (now in Canada, but a British colony at the time), Stewart moved to Wausau, Wisconsin, where he became involved in the lumber industry. Stewart was elected as a Republican to the Fifty-fourth, Fifty-fifth, and Fifty-sixth Congresses (March 4, 1895 – March 3, 1901). He represented Wisconsin's 9th congressional district. He did not run for reelection to the Fifty-seventh Congress.

He was a prominent person in the early days of Wausau and Stewart Avenue, one of the main roads in Wausau, is named in his honor.

Stewart died at his home in Washington, D.C. on May 24, 1912, and was buried in the Pine Grove Cemetery in Wausau.

References

External links

1829 births
1912 deaths
Businesspeople in timber
Pre-Confederation Canadian emigrants to the United States
Politicians from Fredericton
Politicians from Wausau, Wisconsin
Washington, D.C., Republicans
Republican Party members of the United States House of Representatives from Wisconsin
19th-century American politicians